Chaoda Modern Agriculture (Holdings) Limited is a publicly owned company in the production and distribution of ecologically grown vegetables and other agricultural products. It is headquartered in Fuzhou, Fujian province, China.

Chaoda was started in 1994 by Kwok Ho, after initial business interests with the People's Liberation Army.

Chaoda was listed on the Hong Kong Stock Exchange in 2000.

Chaoda is listed on the OTCQB Markets.

Suspicion of Fraud
During 2011, it was the subject of various allegations of fraud and of insider trading by its executives, which have resulted in heavy falls in its share price.

InFebruary 2015, Chaoda started to trade again on the SEHK.

Business
The company exports a variety of vegetables such as Bell Peppers, Broccoli, Carrot, Cauliflower, Cherry Tomato, Chinese Cabbage, Chinese Radish, Choi Sum, Cucumber, Eggplant, Hot Peppers, Iceberg Lettuce, Loquat, Melon, Onion, Potato, Pumpkin, Sugar Snap Peas, Summer Squash, Sweet Corn, Sweet Potato, Tangerine, Watermelon and Welsh Onion.

See also
 List of food companies

References

External links
Chaoda Modern Agriculture (Holdings) Limited

Companies listed on the Hong Kong Stock Exchange
Companies established in 1997
Companies based in Fuzhou
Agriculture companies of China
Food and drink companies of China
Privately held companies of China